KRUF (94.5 FM, "K945") is a radio station broadcasting a Top 40 (CHR) format. The station serves the Shreveport, Louisiana, area.  The station is currently owned by Townsquare Media.  Its studios are shared with its other five sister stations in West Shreveport (one mile west of Shreveport Regional Airport), and the transmitter is in Mooringsport, Louisiana. The call letters before becoming KRUF were KWKH and KROK and had air personalities such as Tim Brando of CBS sports back in the late seventies, early eighties.

K 94.5 is one of the few live and local radio stations left in town with Jay Whatley in the afternoons and Chica in The Morning every morning.

History
K 94.5 signed on August 12, 1996, as "Big Dog 94-5" and has broadcast in its current Top 40 format for 25 years. Previous to adopting the KRUF call letters, K 94.5 was known as KWKH-FM, sister station to the legendary KWKH, home of the Louisiana Hayride.

KWKH-FM began broadcasting November 21, 1948. It was operated by International Broadcasting Corporation, which was owned by The Shreveport Times.

References

Previous logos

External links
K94.5 official website

Radio stations in Louisiana
Contemporary hit radio stations in the United States
Townsquare Media radio stations
Radio stations established in 1948
1948 establishments in Louisiana